Channel 10 is a premier Bengali language television network that carried news and current affairs in India. It was based in Kolkata and broadcast primarily in the South Asian region and sparingly across the USA through partner networks. The slogan of the channel is 'Deser Khobor Doser Khobor' (which means Country's news Ten's news).

Bangladesh office
Channel 10 has Bangladesh Office. More than ten people work here actively. Sahidul Hasan Khokon is the Leader of Bangladesh Team. Journalist Nasir Ahmad Rasel and Shovon Islam is the news person. Besides another three reporter and 2 video journalist also work here.

Competitors
ABP Ananda
24 Ghanta
Kolkata TV 
News Time  
Tara Newz

See also
International broadcasting
List of Indian television stations
24-hour television news channels

External links
 Channel 10 homepage (from archive)

 

24-hour television news channels in India
Bengali-language television channels in India
Television channels and stations established in 2008
Television stations in Kolkata
2008 establishments in West Bengal